Statistics of Swiss Super League in the 1969–70 season.

Overview
14 teams contested in the 1969–70 Nationalliga A. These were the top 12 teams from the previous 1968–69 season and the two newly promoted teams Wettingen and Fribourg. The championship was played in a double round robin, the last two teams at the end of the season to be relegated. Basel won the championship a point clear of Lausanne Sports who ended in second position and three points ahead of FC Zürich who finished third. Wettingen and St. Gallen suffered relegation.

League standings

Results

References

Sources
Switzerland 1969–70 at RSSSF

Swiss Football League seasons
Swiss
1969–70 in Swiss football